Rhythmstick is a 1990 album and video by Dizzy Gillespie and CTI Records All-Stars.

Video Track listing
"Barbados" (Charlie Parker)
"Friday Night at the Cadillac Club" (Bob Berg)
"Nana" (Moacir Santos)
"Caribe" (Michel Camilo)
"Softly, As in a Morning Sunrise" (Sigmund Romberg)
"Palisades in Blue" (Benny Golson)
"Colo De Rio" (Enio Flavio Mol and Marcelo Ferreira)
"Wamba" (Salif Keita)
"Quilombo" (Gilberto Gil and Wally Salomao)

1990 LP Track listing
"Caribe" (Michel Camilo)
"Friday Night at the Cadillac Club" (Bob Berg)
"Quilombo" (Gilberto Gil and Wally Salomao)
"Barbados" (Charlie Parker)
"Nana" (Moacir Santos)
"Softly, As in a Morning Sunrise" (Sigmund Romberg)
"Colo De Rio" (Enio Flavio Mol and Marcelo Ferreira)
"Palisades in Blue" (Benny Golson)
"Wamba" (Salif Keita)

Personnel
In order, from VHS box and LP sleeve notes:

Dizzy Gillespie - trumpet & rhythmstick
Art Farmer - trumpet & flugelhorn
Phil Woods - alto saxophone
Bob Berg - tenor & soprano saxophone
Airto Moreira - percussion & vocals
Flora Purim - vocals
Tito Puente - percussion
Charlie Haden - bass
Marvin "Smitty" Smith - drums
Anthony Jackson - electric bass
Bernard Purdie - drums
John Scofield - electric guitar
Robben Ford - electric guitar
Romero Lubambo - acoustic guitar
Hilton Ruiz - piano
Jimmy McGriff - Hammond B3 organ
Benny Golson - arranger & conductor, additional keyboards, synthesized bass
Jim Beard - additional keyboard and synthesizer solos
Randy Brecker - trumpet
Jon Faddis - trumpet
Amy Roslyn, Janice Pendarvis, Diana Moreira - additional vocals

References

1990 albums
Dizzy Gillespie albums
CTI Records albums
Albums produced by Creed Taylor
Jazz films